Association sportive des Forces armées royales, commonly known as AS FAR, is a professional sport club based in Morocco's capital Rabat, that competes in Botola, the top tier of Moroccan football.

The club was founded in 1958, 3 years after Morocco had gained their independence and is one of the most famous football clubs in Morocco. The club has traditionally worn a black home kit since inception. ASFAR is a well known club for the success of its football section, very popular in and outside the country. The team has played its home matches in the 53,000 capacity Prince Moulay Abdellah Stadium in downtown Rabat since 1983.

The club is one of the most widely supported teams in Africa. ASFAR is one of three founding members of Botola that have never been relegated from the top division since its inception in 1956, along with Wydad AC and Raja CA. The club holds many long-standing rivalries, most notably the rivalries with Wydad AC, Raja CA and FUS Rabat, whom they contest the "Capital Derby".
ASFAR is one of the most successful clubs in Morocco with 30 titles in total: 12 Botolas, 12 Moroccan Throne Cups, 4 Moroccan Super Cups, 1 Botola 2, 1 African Champions League and 1 African Confederation Cup. They were the first Moroccan team to win the African Champions League in 1985.

ASFAR is the most successful moroccan club of the 21st century, and was ranked first locally, 10 continental and 201 universally, in the international rankings of clubs during the first ten years of the 21st century (2001–2010), issued by the International Federation of Football History & Statistics in 2011.

History

Early years (1958–1965) 

ASFAR was founded on 1 September 1958, by the initiative of the Crown Prince Moulay El Hassan, who was an avid football fan himself, by signing a decree as High Commander of the Moroccan Royal Army. The club scouts and players work with the Royal Armed Forces to develop players in multiple aspects (technical level, fitness management, sportsmanship).

One year after its creation, the football team, while still in the second division, won their first Throne Cup. The same year the club finished first in the division of the Moroccan Championship. In Moroccan Throne Cup, they manage to hide in eighths of final and then face the Wydad Casablanca, the latter is beaten on the score of 1–0. During the quarter-finals, the military defeated the Fath Union Sport Rabat at the first Rabat derby, where ASFAR won the match 3–1. The final took place on December 14, 1959, face Mouloudia Oujda won the first two editions of the throne cup and prepares to make a triple while the military, for their first season, a cut of the throne would be the ideal. Finally the ASFAR win this match on the 1–0 score that is stuck at Stade Mohammed V.

The Royal Army’s won its second title in less than two years, after it squandered the championship title in a play-off against the KAC Kénitra. The 1964-65 season was known for repeated arbitration mistakes, and the meeting with Maghreb de Fès was the point that overflowed the cup with a disastrous arbitration that directly affected the outcome of the meeting and the fate of the championship title by virtue of the fact that the defeat ended 3-0 and in Rabat, the match with a quarrel between the players and the referee. After the incident, the Royal Moroccan Football Federation took an unfair decision to suspend the club for a full season and thus not participate in the championship and cup for the following season 1965-66. The military team spent a white season away from local stadiums, but it did not stop competing, as it preferred to play international matches against international teams and teams to maintain competitiveness. They played nearly 50 international matches in one season against international teams in various European countries such as Spain, France and Russia, including Cádiz CF, Recreativo de Huelva and Gibraltar, most notably against Barcelona at the Camp Nou on December 25, 1966, which ended with four goals to zero in favor of the Spaniards, while they succeeded in snatching a tie against Atlético Madrid in a match on the occasion of the inauguration of the Vicente Calderón Stadium, ended with a score of 2-2, before the team visited the Soviet Union in two trips, the team drew 1-1 against Dinamo Moscow.

Domination of Moroccan football (1965–1984) 
The Royal Army returned to the atmosphere of competition in the championship, after the banned season. ASFAR was crowned with two other titles immediately after resuming its activity in the championship in 1967 and 1968 and 1970.

In the same period, at the beginning of the sixties, Al-Asaker also took control of the Moroccan Super Cup winning it in four out of six times. Then the Royal Army, led by its French coach Clezo, began to dominate the league competition by winning four titles, and the team’s first meeting with the championship title was in the 1960-61 season, and control of the championship title continued for four consecutive seasons until 1964 as a new record.

Internationally and in the same era, the Royal Army team had the honor of participating in the first edition of the Mohammed V Cup in 1962, after winning the league title the same year, the Royal Army was ranked third, after a 5-0 defeat against French club Stade Reims. They were set to face Real Madrid for the third place position, the match ended in 4-3 victory, thus becoming the first Arab and African team to beat the 20th Century Club.

In their fifth participation, the military team was able to reach the final of the Mohammed V Cup for the first time in 1967, when it eliminated in the semi-finals the Dukla Prague with a score of 1-0, to face the Bulgarian CSKA Sofia in the final, which won the title at the expense of the military team with great difficulty by a score of 1- 0. The military team returned to the Mohammed V Cup final in 1970 for the second time, where they faced the Spanish giant Atlético Madrid, the Royal Army lost 4-1.

ASFAR was the first Moroccan team to participate in African competitions by drawing the 1968 African Cup of Champions Clubs, after winning the league for the same year. With the beginning of the seventies, exactly in 1971, and after an absence of 11 years, the military team, accompanied by its Spanish coach Sabino Barinaga, won the second title of the Moroccan Throne Cup at the expense of Maghreb Fez, after the match ended in a 9-8 penalty shootout victory.

First African title (1984-2004) 
After a long 12 years trophyless run, ASFAR achieved the most important victory by winning the championship titles and the Moroccan Throne Cup, despite the short period that José Faria spent as the teams coach.

The Royal Army team entered the African competition, after winning the championship title, by participating in the 1985 African Cup of Champions Clubs. It entered history as the first Moroccan team to win a continental title. the Royal Army team reached the semi-finals of the African Champions League for the second time in its history, where it faced the Egyptian team Zamalek, and the first leg ended with a score of 1-0 from a penalty kick in favor of the Egyptians in Cairo, and the same result was recorded in Rabat from A penalty kick by Shesha before the match was settled by penalty kicks (4-3), which saw the brilliance of goalkeeper Salah El-Din Hamid, who gave the team qualification for the final round by blocking two penalties, and the joy was not yet complete. In the final, the FAR team faced AS Bilima, the champions of the Democratic Republic of the Congo, and despite the injury of Timoumi and Abdeslam Laghrissi, the first leg match in Rabat ended with a great victory for the military team, 5-2. The away game ended in a 1-1 draw which gifted the Royal Army their first CAF Champions League title. After this historical achievement, Hassan II of Morocco insisted on receiving the military team at his residence in the suburbs of the French capital, Paris, after this first African coronation of its kind. The team is an exceptional congratulations from King Hassan II.

The team went on to win three Throne Cup in a row. The Royal Army became the second team to have the honor of keeping the cup in its treasury after Kawkab Marrakech, because the law of the competition grants the winner of the title three times in a row the honor of keeping the Silver Cup permanently. In the 1986 Afro-Asian Club Championship, the first edition of its kind, which was held in Riyadh in January 1987, between the Royal Army, the African champions, and the South Korean club, Busan IPark, the Asian champion, noticed the defeat of ASFAR by a score of 2-0.

Then the Royal Army team embraced the championship title for the second time with Faria in 1987, and in 1989 with Argentine Angelillo, making the military team the first team to reach 10 championships. This generation continued its continental tour by reaching the semi-finals of the 1988 African Cup of Champions Clubs for the third time in the team's history. To the penalty shootout that defined the Nigerian team's superiority, the Royal Army missed another opportunity to cross into the final.

The Return (2004-) 

The Royal Army won two successive titles for the Moroccan Throne Cup in two Clasico matches at the expense of rival Wydad Casablanca, in 2003 with a goal of zero from a header by Hafeez Abdel-Sadiq with a pass from Ahmed, and in the 2004 final, the match ended in a goalless draw, which continued into overtime as well, to decide the penalty shootout, which marked the brilliance of goalkeeper Tariq Al-Jarmouni, and the match ended with the army winning 3-0 on penalties.

After a long absence from the championship title that lasted 15 seasons, the military team returned to win its 11th league title in 2005, in a historic match drawing the 30th and last round of the league, in the Mohammed V compound in front of Raja Casablanca, leaders by two points, which needed a draw only to crown the title, but it was The soldiers have another opinion, and the Mohamed Fakhir battalion was able to overthrow Raja and win a clean double signed by Mohamed Armoumen, who also won the top scorer title. The army took the championship title from the city of Casablanca amid a great public astonishment for the opponent and the great joy of the soldiers, where the meeting was titled in the 21st century match in the Moroccan championship.

After 20 years of winning its first African title, the FAR team won the CAF Confederation Cup in 2005 after defeating the Nigerian Dolphins F.C 3-1 in aggregate. Asfar later went on to lose the 2006 CAF Super Cup against Al Ahly SC on penalties.

On 2 December 2006, Asfar lost the 2006 CAF Confederation Cup final after losing to Étoile Sportive du Sahel on an away goal. In 2007, Asfar won the Throne Cup after defeating Rachad Bernoussi on penalties. Next season, they managed to clinch both domestic titles, the 2008 Botola and the Throne Cup. IN 2009, Asfar won the Throne Cup after defeating Fath Union Sport on penalties. 

After 11 trophyless seasons, Asfar clinched the 2020 Throne Cup after defeating Moghreb Tétouan 3-0. They qualified to the 2023 CAF Confederation Cup, after a 15 year continental drought.

Grounds

Prince Moulay Abdellah Stadium

Prince Moulay Abdellah Stadium is a multi-purpose stadium in Rabat, Morocco. It is named after Prince Moulay Abdellah of Morocco. It was built in 1983 and is the home ground of ASFAR. It is currently used mostly for football matches and it can also stage athletics. The stadium holds 52,000. Since 2008 it is host of the Meeting International Mohammed VI d'Athlétisme de Rabat. It was a confirmed venue for the 2015 Africa Cup of Nations until Morocco was stripped of its hosting rights. It was also a venue for the 2014 FIFA Club World Cup.

ASFAR Football Academy

Sports Center of FAR

Honours 
This is a list of honours for the senior AS FAR team that include a total of 30 Trophies 

 
  shared record

Other competitions
Trofeo Semana del Sol
Winner (1): 1977
Trofeo Ciudad de Cordoba, Spain
Runners-up (1): 1976
North African Cup of Champions
Runners-up (1): 2008
International elite championship
Runners-up (1): 2008
Ahmed Antifit Tournament
Winner (1): 2007
Runners-up (1): 2009

Top scorers in Botola

The ASFAR controls the title of Top scorers in Botola, which has the largest number of scorers a total of 14 times.Morocco - List of Topscorers

Top scorers in CAF Champions League

Performance in CAF competitions

At the continental level, AS FAR is the first Moroccan club to have participated in an African Cup; It was in 1968, when it has reached the stage of the semi-finals of the African Cup of Champions Clubs. She was also the first Moroccan club to win the CAF Champions League, in 1985.

CAF Champions League: 6 appearances
2005 – Second Round
2006 – Second Round
2007 – Group stage (Top 8)
2008 – Preliminary Round
2009 – First Round
2014 – Preliminary Round

African Cup of Champions Clubs: 5 appearances
1968 – Semi-finals
1985 – Champion
1986 – Quarter-finals
1988 – Semi-finals
1990 – Second Round

CAF Confederation Cup: 6 appearances
2004 – Play-off round
2005 – Champion
2006 – Finalist
2010 – First Round
2013 – Play-off round
2022 – Second round

CAF Cup Winners' Cup: 5 appearances
1987 – Quarter-finals
1997 – Finalist
1999 – Quarter-finals
2000 – Quarter-finals
2001 – Second Round

CAF Super Cup: 1 appearances
2006 – Finalist

African cups all-time statistics

Players

First team squad

Managers

Current technical staff 

 Last updated: 21 August 2021

Former coach

 Fin Mohamed Anouar (shtoki) (1958–59)	
 Fin Larbi Benbarek (1959–60)
 Guy Cluseau (1960–69)
 Mustafa El Ghazouani (1969–70)
 Sabino Barinaga (1970–71)
 Blagoje Vidinić (1971–72)
 Anoul dos Santos (1972–73)
 Amar Ben Siffedine (1972–73)
 Sabino Barinaga (1973–74)
 Fin Driss Bamous (1973–74)
 Guy Clisaux (1974–80)
 Sabino Barinaga (1980–82)
 Mircea Dridea (1982–83)
  Fin José Faria (1983–88)
  Antonio Angelillo (1988–90)
  Fin José Faria (1990–92)
 Mustapha Dafarallah (1992–93)
  Mário Wilson (1993–95)
 Jesualdo Ferreira (1995–96)
 Carlos Alhinho (1996–97)
 Henri Depireux (1997–98)
 Georges Heylens (1998–99)
 Rachid Taoussi (1999–2000)
 Henri Depireux (2000–2001)
 Alain Giresse (July 1, 2001 – June 30, 2003)
 Mohamed Fakhir (2004–05)
 Henri Stambouli (March 1, 2006 – Jan 6, 2007)
 Jaouad Milani (2007)
 Mustapha Madih (2007–2008)
 Mohamed Fakhir (2008–2009)
 Walter Meeuws (July 16, 2009 – Nov 7, 2009)
 Aziz El Amri (2010)
 Mustapha Madih (2010–2011)
 Fathi Jamal (Nov 1, 2011 – April 16, 2012)
 Rachid Taoussi (July 1, 2012 – Dec 7, 2012)
 Abderrazak Khairi (Dec 7, 2012 – June 25, 2013)
 Jaouad Milani (July 1, 2013 – Oct 1, 2013)
 Rachid Taoussi (Oct 22, 2013 – Dec 13, 2014)
 José Romão (2015–16)
 Abdelmalek El Aziz (2016)
 Aziz El Amri (2016–2018)
 Abderrazak Khairi (2018)
 Mohamed Fakhir (2018)
 Carlos Alós Ferrer (2019)
 Abderrahim Taleb (2019–2020)
 Sven Vandenbroeck (2021–2022)
 Fernando Da Cruz (2022–)

Sports Club

There are several other sporting branches in the club besides football professionally and the results of the Club in those prestigious results are sports and distinct local and continental levels.

Popular culture 
In 2009, a documentary book was published by the player and coach Azzouz Belfaida with the help of his brother Abdelaziz under the title AS FAR : The Story of a Football Legend and documenting fifty years full of achievements and titles from the career of the AS FAR football team, From its founding in 1958 at the initiative of Hassan II of Morocco, then Crown Prince, until 2009, it is the first book of its kind in Morocco.

In 2018, the two brothers, Azzouz and Abdelaziz Belfayda, issued a new book on the AS FAR, which includes an inventory of the most important achievements and failures in the period between 2009 and 2017. The new 159-page book, titled “A Renewed Story of a Football Legend,” aims to document and excavate the military team’s archives by reviewing the stations that made it a strong team, before its level declined in recent years, reinforced by rare photos, whether of former stars or Currently. Azzouz Belfayda, a historian of the AS FAR, explained that the new version includes accurate details of the team's path from 2009 to now, adding that its purpose is to highlight the role of the military team in producing players throughout history.

Supporters
ASFAR has the largest number of supporters of any team in Morocco the greater the focus of fans are in The region Rabat-Salé-Kénitra, It has a population of 4,580,866. Also, the club has an important fan base inside the country, where several towns are renowned for counting vast majorities of ASFAR supporters, and outside the borders, among Moroccan emigrants.

The ASFAR Ultras movement began in 2005, when the bases of Ultras Askary Rabat (UAR), And The second group Black Army (BA) was created in 2006, Their sanctuary is the southern Included of the Prince Moulay Abdellah Stadium.

References

External links

Official club website
Official supporters website

Football clubs in Morocco
Football clubs in Rabat
Association football clubs established in 1958
Sport in Rabat
1958 establishments in Morocco
Sports clubs in Morocco
 
Sport in Salé
Multi-sport clubs in Morocco
Unrelegated association football clubs
Military association football clubs
Military sports clubs
Armed Forces sports society
CAF Champions League winning clubs
CAF Confederation Cup winning clubs